Mathias Hagerup (1765–1822) was a Norwegian director general in Stockholm 1814–1822, and acting state secretary to the Council of State Division in Stockholm and acting councillor of state in 1822.

References

1765 births
1822 deaths
Government ministers of Norway